Pantha is a superhero from Teen Titans.

Pantha may also refer to:

Fictional characters:
 Pantha (Vampirella character), an immortal shapeshifter.
 Princess Pantha, a jungle heroine from Nedor's Thrilling Comics.

Other uses:
 Pantha (band), an Australian musical group from the 1970s
 Pantha du Prince, a stage name of German musician Hendrick Weber.
 Panthapath, a road/marketplace in Dhaka, the capital of Bangladesh.
 Panthan, Sanskrit for path.